Lovett Lee House is a historic home located near Giddensville, Sampson County, North Carolina.   The house was built about 1880, and is a two-story, single pile frame dwelling with Late Victorian style decorative elements. It has a rear ell, hipped roof, and decorative double-tier front porch. The interior follows a central hall plan.

It was added to the National Register of Historic Places in 1986.

References

Houses on the National Register of Historic Places in North Carolina
Victorian architecture in North Carolina
Houses completed in 1880
Houses in Sampson County, North Carolina
National Register of Historic Places in Sampson County, North Carolina